Deep Run is a tributary of Upper Broad Creek in Craven County, North Carolina. Its GNIS I.D. number is 984096.

References

Rivers of North Carolina